The Avenue of the Baobabs, or Alley of the Baobabs, is a prominent group of Grandidier's baobabs (Adansonia grandidieri) lining the dirt road between Morondava and Belon'i Tsiribihina in the Menabe region of western Madagascar. Its striking landscape draws travelers from around the world, making it one of the most visited locations in the region. It has been a center of local conservation efforts, and was granted temporary protected status in July 2007 by the Ministry of Environment, Water and Forestry – a step toward making it Madagascar's first natural monument.

Description 

Along a  stretch of the road is a grove of 20–25 Adansonia grandidieri baobabs. An additional 25 or so trees of this species are found growing over nearby rice paddies and meadows within  of land.

The baobab trees, known locally as renala or reniala (from Malagasy reny ala "mother of the forest"), are up to 2,800 years old. They are a legacy of the dense tropical forests that once thrived on Madagascar. The trees did not originally tower in isolation over the sere landscape of scrub, but stood in dense forest. Over the years, as the country's population grew, the forests were cleared for agriculture, leaving only the baobab trees, which the locals preserved as much for their own sake as for their value as a food source and building material.

Baobab Amoureux 

Some  to the northwest are the Baobab Amoureux, which are two notable Adansonia za trees—also an endemic baobab species—that have become twisted to each other as they grew. According to legend, these two baobabs came and grew together across the centuries. Baobabs found themselves after an impossible love between a young man and young woman of the nearby village. Both youths already had designated partners and had to marry separately in their respective villages. However, the impossible couple dreamed of a life and child together and asked the help of their god. Both baobabs were born and now live there for eternity as one as the couple always wished.

Conservation status 

The area is a natural monument under conservation since July 2015, but the trees are still threatened by further deforestation, effluents from encroaching paddy fields, bushfires, and forest fires. Despite its popularity as a tourist destination, the area has no visitor center or gate fees, and local residents receive little income from tourism. Fanamby, a Malagasy non-governmental organization, has launched an ecotourism project aimed at conservation of the area and economic improvement for the local community since 2014 and has inaugurated infrastructures to help them promote the area in 2018.

Gallery

References

External links 

 Avenue of the Baobabs – All you need to know on World Guide
 

Geography of Madagascar
Menabe
Protected areas of Madagascar
Forests of Madagascar
Individual baobab trees